Vetehinen may refer to:

 , a water spirit in Finnish folklore, related to the Nixies
 Vetehinen-class submarine, a Finnish submarine class
 Finnish submarine Vetehinen, a Finnish submarine